The France National Renewable Energy Action Plan is the National Renewable Energy Action Plan (NREAP) for France. The plan was commissioned by the Directive 2009/28/EC which required Member States of the European Union to notify the European Commission with a road map. The report describes how France planned to achieve its legally binding target of a 23% share of energy from renewable sources in gross final consumption of energy by 2020.

The expected total energy consumption in 2020 is 155,268 ktoe and hence the amount of energy from renewable sources in 2020 should be 35,711 ktoe. The National Renewable Energy Action Plan sets a target of the share of renewable energies to be 27% in electricity sector, 33% in heating/cooling sector and 10,5% in transport sector by 2020.

Main incentives and laws in France
Grenelle de l’Environnement 1 (2007) and 2 (2010) are the basis for the action plan. France focuses on comprehensive improvement of energy efficiency and the use of all renewable energies will be increased. Each administrative division of the country has to compile a plan, SRACE (Schéma Régional du Climat, de l’Air et de L’Energie), with both qualitative and quantitative targets for the use of renewable energies. In addition, PPI (Programmation pluriannuelle des investissements de production d’electricité et de chaleur) is a plan to strengthen the energy sector and reach the targets set. One target in France is also to simplify the administrative processes and increase the amount of bidding processes related to renewable energies.

Wind energy:
Each SRCAE (Schéma Régional du Climat, de l’Air et de L’Energie) include regional wind energy plan with potential locations for onshore and offshore production. Overall target for wind energy in France by 2020 is 25 000 MW (onshore 19 000 MW, offshore 6 000 MW).

National energy company EDF or other energy company is obliged to buy the produced wind power from the specific locations for wind power (ZDE).

Feed-in tariffs in France for wind power are following: 
(first 10 years) onshore 0,082 €/kWh, offshore 0,13 €/kWh
(after 10 years) onshore 0,028 – 0,082 €/kWh, offshore 0,03 – 0,13 €/kWh.

Solar energy:

Target for solar energy is 5% (5400 MW) of renewable energies by 2020

Solar energy tariffs are based on markets and the size of the system

Unique feature in France is to prefer integrated solar energy systems with higher tariffs

Fond Chaleur: fund for supporting heat production of renewable energies (solar thermal included)

Bioenergy:

According to Grenelle 2, 50% of renewable energy targets will be achieved by biomass

Bidding processes

Feed-in tariffs for bioenergy (only over 5 MW CHP-plants): 0,045 €/kWh for electricity, 0,08-0,13 €/kWh bonus according to efficiency and resource use of the plant. No tariff for produced heat

Fond Chaleur: fund for supporting heat production of renewable energies

Key players in France 

The French Renewable Energies Association (SER)
The French Solar Energy Association
Ministry of Ecology, Sustainable Development, Transport and Housing
French Environment and Energy Management Agency
Regulatory Commission of Energy
French Wind Energy Association (FEE)
Windustry France

References

Renewable energy in France
Action plans